Jones Soda is an American beverage maker known for premium carbonated soft drinks with unusual flavors and labels. The company is based in Seattle, Washington. Currently, 64 flavors have been sold.  Consumers are drawn to both the flavor offerings as well as the brand's quirky image.

Jones Soda Co: the original six flavors
Orange
Cherry
Lemon-Lime
Strawberry-Lime
Grape
Raspberry

Seasonal and limited-edition flavors
Thanksgiving

2003 
Turkey & Gravy

2004 
Turkey & Gravy
Cranberry
Mashed Potatoes & Butter
Green Bean Casserole
Fruit Cake

2005 (National Pack) 
Turkey & Gravy
Brussels Sprout with Prosciutto
Cranberry
Wild Herb Stuffing
Pumpkin Pie

2005 (Regional Pack) 
Turkey & Gravy
Broccoli Casserole
Salmon Pâté
Corn on the Cob
Pecan Pie

2006 
Turkey & Gravy
Sweet Potato
Dinner Roll
Pea
Antacid

2006 (Dessert Pack) 
Cherry Pie
Banana Cream Pie
Key Lime Pie
Apple Pie
Blueberry Pie
Christmas
Sugar Plum
Candy Cane
Egg Nog
Valentine's Day
Love Potion #6 (as opposed to "Love Potion No. 9")
Halloween

8 oz. Cans 
Candy Corn
Strawberry S'lime
Scary Berry Lemonade
Caramel Apple
Spider Cider
Berried Alive
Gruesome Grape
Sour Lemon Drop Dead
Spooookiwi
TheGrapist
Buried Pomegranate

Halloween

2006 Halloween 12 oz. Bottle Flavors 
Lemon Drop Dead
Creepy Cranberry
Monster Mojito

2007 Halloween 12 oz. bottle Flavors 

Black Cat Licorice
Dread Licorice (a Pun on Red Licorice)
Monster Mojito

2013 Halloween 8 oz. Cans 
Return of Candy Corn
Terror of Blood Orange
Dawn of Caramel Apple
Night of Red licorice

Seahawks Collector Pack 
Perspiration
Natural Field Turf
Dirt
Sweet Victory
Sports Cream

2007 Holiday 12 oz. bottle flavors 
Gingerbread Man
Christmas Cocoa
Candy Cane ('repeat' from 2006)
Egg Nog (part of 'Christmas Pack', 'repeat' from 2006)
Sugar Plum (part of 'Christmas Pack', 'repeat' from 2006)
Christmas Ham (part of 'Christmas Pack')
"Christmas Tree" (part of 'Christmas Pack')
Chocolate Coins (part of 'Chanukah Pack')
Applesauce (part of 'Chanukah Pack')
Jelly Doughnut (part of 'Chanukah Pack')
Latke (part of 'Chanukah Pack')
2008 Holiday 12 oz. bottle flavors
Spiced Pear
Candy Cane ('repeat' from past two years)
Mele Kalikimaka (Hawaiian for "Merry Christmas"; a tropical flavor)

The 'Christmas Ham' flavor was first created internally, years ago, by the company as a favor for The David Letterman Show where it was originally called Big Ass Canned Ham Soda. Only a few of these bottles still exist and three separate labels featuring various parts of a live pig were made. When the idea was pitched to make the flavor available as a special-run flavor, the company vetoed it, stating it was "doubtful" anyone would want to purchase it.

Rare and limited run sodas
Jingle Lime Soda
Jingle Berry Soda
Jingle Blue Bubble Gum Soda
Jingle Cream Soda
Big Ass Canned Ham Soda
Nyan Cat Soda
Road Kill Soda
Billy Pop
Pure Cane Ginger Ale
Club Soda
Red Line Root Beer
Strawberry and banana mania
Minecraft soda flavors
Poutine Soda
Fox Fuel Green Apple (shipped with Star Fox Adventures preorders)
Fallout Nuka-Cola, including cherry, victory and quantum variants (2009-10, 2014-16 and 2020-present)

Unusual flavors
Chocolate
Peachy Keen
FuFu Berry
Hippy
Pineapple Upside Down
Invisible (no flavor listed, just a photograph)
Fun
Pink
Bug Juice (Discontinued)
Candy Corn
Bacon (2010)
Peanut Butter and Jelly

Natural Jones Soda
Lemon Ginger
Passion
Root Beer
Peach Ginseng

Ordinary flavors
Root Beer
Fruit Punch
Cream Soda
Vanilla Cola
Orange & Cream
Mf Grape
Blue Bubblegum
Kiwi
Berry Lemonade
Tangerine
Watermelon
Blueberry
Blueberry Pomegranate
Crushed Melon
Green Apple
Lemon Drop
Cherry
Strawberries and Cream
Pure Cane Cola
Twisted Lime
Pure Cane Lemon Lime

Sugar Free Jones Soda
Sugar Free Black Cherry
Sugar Free Root Beer
Sugar Free Chocolate Fudge
Sugar Free Berries and Cream
Sugar Free Cream Soda
Sugar Free Ginger Ale
Sugar Free Pink Grapefruit
Sugar Free Green Apple
Sugar Free Cola
Slim Root Beer
Slim Lime Cola
Slim Fu Fu Berry
Slim Cream Soda
Slim Orange Soda

Jones Zilch Zero Calorie
Black Cherry
Cola
Cream Soda
Pomegranate
Vanilla Bean

Jones energy drinks
8 oz. Original Jones Energy
1 oz. Whoopass Energy Shot
8 oz. Whoopass Energy
8 oz. Jones Energy Lime
8 oz. Jones Energy Mixed Berry
8 oz. Jones Energy Orange
16 oz. Big Ol' Can of Whoopass
16 oz. Jones Energy
16 oz. Jones Sugar Free Energy

Jones organics flavors
Strawberry White Tea
Cherry White Tea
Berry Green Tea
Mandarin Green Tea
Tropical Red Tea
Peach Red Tea

Natural flavors

Bohemian Raspberry
Berry White
Bada Bing!
D'Peach Mode
Limes With Orange
Bananaberry
Strawberry Manilow
Fu Cran Fu
Betty
Dave
Açai
Your Momegranate

Jones juice flavors
Dave
Betty
Fu Cran Fu
Berry White (in honor of The Golden Girls' Betty White)
Black
Purple Carrot
Bada Bing

24C Enhanced Water
Berry Pomegranate
Cranberry Apple
Tropical Citrus
Peach Mango
Mandarin Orange
Blueberry Grape
Kiwi Dragonfruit
Red Grapefruit
Strawberry Lemonade

References

External links
Official website

Jones Soda